Ragnar Berge (15 January 1925 – 3 February 1995) was a Norwegian footballer who played for Vålerenga. His grandson, Sander Berge is a professional footballer who currently plays for Sheffield United.

References

External links
 

1925 births
1995 deaths
Footballers from Oslo
Norwegian footballers
Vålerenga Fotball players
Norway international footballers
Association football defenders